Aslambek Ilyasovich Idigov (born 9 November 1995) is a Russian professional boxer who has held the IBF and WBO European super-middleweight titles since 2019.

Professional career
Idigov made his professional debut on 2 July 2013, scoring a four-round unanimous decision (UD) victory over Serhiy Us at the Spartak Gym in Kyiv, Ukraine.

After compiling a record of 10–0 (4 KOs) he captured his first professional title, the IBO Youth super-middleweight title by defeating Igor Selivanov via UD on 10 December 2016 at the Soviet Wings Sport Palace in Moscow, Russia. One judge scored the bout 100–90 and the other two scored it 99–92, all in favour of Idigov.

He secured another four wins, three by stoppage, before facing Ronny Landaeta for the vacant IBF European and WBO European super-middleweight titles on 18 April 2019 at the Colosseum Sport Hall in Grozny, Russia. Idigov captured the regional titles via majority decision (MD), with two judges scoring the bout 118–112 and 115–113 in favour of Idigov while the third scored it even at 114–114.

Professional titles held

 IBO - International Boxing Organization World Youth Super Middle Title (2016)
 WBO - World Boxing Organisation European Super Middle Title (2019)
 IBF - International Boxing Federation European Super Middle Title (2019)
 WBA - World Boxing Association Asia Super Middle Title (2020)

Professional boxing record

References

Living people
1995 births
Russian male boxers
Sportspeople from Grozny
Super-middleweight boxers